The 2003 Polo Open was a women's tennis tournament played on outdoor hard courts in Shanghai, China. It was the 5th edition of the China Open, and was a Tier II tournament on the 2003 WTA Tour. The tournament was played between 15 – 21 September 2003. First-seeded Elena Dementieva won the singles title.

The tournament was not part of the 2003 ATP Tour, as no male events took place.

Singles main-draw entrants

Seeds

 1 Rankings are as of 8 September 2003.

Other entrants
The following players received wildcards into the singles main draw:
  Sun Tiantian
  Zheng Jie

The following players received entry from the singles qualifying draw:

  Tathiana Garbin
  Jelena Janković
  Rossana Neffa-de los Ríos
  Martina Suchá

The following players received entry as lucky losers into the singles main draw:
  Jill Craybas

Doubles main-draw entrants

Seeds

1 Rankings as of 8 September 2003.

Other entrants
The following players received entry from the singles qualifying draw:
  Aiko Nakamura /  Seiko Okamoto

The following pairs received entry as lucky losers into the doubles main draw:
  Dong Yanhua /  Zhang Yao

Champions

Singles

 Elena Dementieva def.  Chanda Rubin, 6–3, 7–6(8–6)

Women's doubles

 Émilie Loit /  Nicole Pratt def.  Ai Sugiyama /  Tamarine Tanasugarn, 6–3, 6–3

External links
 2003 China Open Drawsheets

 
China Open
2003
2003 in Chinese tennis
September 2003 sports events in China